Corrie Vince D'Alessio (born September 9, 1969) is a Canadian former professional ice hockey goaltender who played in one National Hockey League game for the Hartford Whalers during the 1992–93 NHL season.

D'Alessio played 11 minutes of the Whalers 9-3 loss to the Buffalo Sabres on the 11th of December 1992, saving the 3 shots that were directed at him.

Career statistics

Regular season and playoffs

Awards and honors

See also
List of players who played only one game in the NHL

References

External links

1969 births
Living people
Canadian people of Italian descent
Canadian ice hockey goaltenders
Cornell Big Red men's ice hockey players
Hartford Whalers players
Ice hockey people from Ontario
Las Vegas Thunder players
Milwaukee Admirals (IHL) players
Sportspeople from Cornwall, Ontario
Springfield Indians players
Vancouver Canucks draft picks